José Ignacio Rodríguez Valbuena (born in Maracaibo, Venezuela on March 17, 1979) is a Venezuelan model who won the title of Mister Venezuela in 2005. He resigned his title of Mister Venezuela in 2006.

References

External links
Mister Venezuela 2005 Photogallery
Monarcas de Venezuela Blog
Miss Venezuela La Nueva Era MB

Male beauty pageant winners
Living people
1979 births